Mohamad Shuif Hussain (born 1967) is a Bruneian entrepreneur involved in real estate, leisure and hospitality. Shuif is an investor in The Strategic Iconic Assets Heritage Acquisition Fund (SIAHAF) and a Director of AAFM Investments in Brunei Darussalam. Hussain is one of the principals behind the recent acquisition of large parts of the Queensway district of West London with a view to the redevelopment of the area.

Early life and education
Born in 1967, he was educated at the Science School in Brunei, followed by Millfield in Somerset, and Leicester Polytechnic.

References

Living people
1967 births
People educated at Millfield
Alumni of Leicester Polytechnic
Bruneian businesspeople
Accountants